The Serer people are a West African ethnoreligious group. They are the third-largest ethnic group in Senegal, making up 15% of the Senegalese population. They are also found in northern Gambia and southern Mauritania.

The Serer people originated in the Senegal River valley at the border of Senegal and Mauritania, moved south in the 11th and 12th century, then again in the 15th and 16th centuries as their villages were invaded and they were subjected to religious pressures. They have had a sedentary settled culture and have been known for their farming expertise and transhumant stock-raising.

The Serer people have been historically noted as an ethnic group practicing elements of both matrilineality and patrilineality that long resisted the expansion of Islam, fought against jihads in the 19th century, then opposed the French colonial rule. In the 20th century, most of them converted to Islam (Sufism), but some are Christians or follow their traditional religion. The Serer society, like other ethnic groups in Senegal, has had social stratification featuring endogamous castes and slaves, although other historians, such as Thiaw, Richard and others, reject a slave culture among this group, or at least not to the same extent as other ethnic groups in the region.

The Serer people are also referred to as Sérère, Sereer, Serrere, Serere, Sarer, Kegueme, Seereer and sometimes wrongly "Serre".

Demographics and distribution

The Serer people are primarily found in contemporary Senegal, particularly in the west-central part of the country, running from the southern edge of Dakar to the Gambian border. In The Gambia, they occupy parts of old "Nuimi" and "Baddibu" as well as the Gambian "Kombo". The Serer-Noon occupy the ancient area of Thiès in modern-day Senegal. The Serer-Ndut are found in southern Cayor and north west of ancient Thiès. The Serer-Njeghen occupy old Baol; the Serer-Palor occupies the west central, west southwest of Thiès and the Serer-Laalaa occupy west central, north of Thiès and the Tambacounda area.

The Serer people are diverse and though they spread throughout the Senegambia region, they are more numerous in places like old Baol, Sine, Saloum and in The Gambia, which was a colony of the Kingdom of Saloum.

Senegal: 1.84 million (15% of total)
The Gambia: 53,567 (3.1% of total)<ref
name="2013Census"></ref>
Mauritania: 3,500

The Serer (also known as "Seex" or "Sine-Sine") occupy the Sine and Saloum areas (now part of modern-day independent Senegal). The Serer people include the Seex (Serer or Serer-Sine), Serer-Noon (sometimes spelt "Serer-None", "Serer-Non" or just Noon), Serer-Ndut (also spelt "N’doute"), Serer-Njeghene (sometimes spelt "Serer-Dyegueme" or "Serer-Gyegem" or "Serer-N'Diéghem"), Serer-Safene, Serer-Niominka, Serer-Palor (also known as "Falor", "Palar", "Siili", "Siili-Mantine", "Siili-Siili", "Waro" or just "Serer"), and the Serer-Laalaa (sometimes known as "Laa", "La" or "Lâ" or just "Serer"). Each group speaks Serer or a Cangin language. "Serer" is the standard English spelling. "Seereer" or "Sereer" reflects the Serer pronunciation of the name and are mostly used by Senegalese Serer historians or scholars.

Ethnonym

The meaning of the word "Serer" is uncertain. Issa Laye Thiaw views it as possibly pre-Islamic and suggests four possible derivations:

 From the Serer Wolof word reer meaning 'misplaced', i.e. doubting the truth of Islam.
 From the Serer Wolof expression seer reer meaning "to find something hidden or lost."  
 From "the Arabic word seereer meaning sahir magician or one who practices magic (an allusion to the traditional religion)".  
 From a Pulaar word meaning separation, divorce, or break, again referring to rejecting Islam.

Professor Cheikh Anta Diop citing the work of the 19th-century French archeologist and Egyptologist, Paul Pierret, states that the word Serer means "he who traces the temple." Diop went on to write: "That would be consistent with their present religious position: they are one of the rare Senegalese populations who still reject Islam. Their route is marked by the upright stones found at about the same latitude from Ethiopia all the way to the Sine-Salum, their present habitat." Other historians such as R. G. Schuh have refuted Diop's thesis.

History

Professor Dennis Galvan writes that "The oral historical record, written accounts by early Arab and European explorers, and physical anthropological evidence suggest that the various Serer peoples migrated south from the Fuuta Tooro region (Senegal River valley) beginning around the eleventh century when Islam first came across the Sahara." Over generations these people, possibly Pulaar speaking herders originally, migrated through Wolof areas and entered the Siin and Saluum river valleys. This lengthy period of Wolof-Serer contact has left us unsure of the origins of shared "terminology, institutions, political structures, and practices."

Professor Étienne Van de Walle gave a slightly later date, writing that "The formation of the Sereer ethnicity goes back to the thirteenth century, when a group came from the Senegal River valley in the north fleeing Islam, and near Niakhar met another group of Mandinka origin, called the Gelwar, who came from the southeast (Gravrand 1983). The actual Sereer ethnic group is a mixture of the two groups, and this may explain their complex bilinear kinship system".

Their own oral traditions recite legends on they being part of, or related to the Toucouleur people in the Senegal River valley area. Serer people resisted Islamization and later Wolofization from possibly the 11th century during the Almoravid movement, and migrated south where they intermixed with the Diola people. They also violently resisted the 19th century jihads and Marabout movement to convert Senegambia to Islam.

After the Ghana Empire was sacked as certain kingdoms gained their independence, Abu-Bakr Ibn-Umar, leader of the Almoravids launched a jihad into the region. According to Serer oral history, a Serer bowman named Amar Godomat shot and killed Abu-Bakr Ibn-Umar with an arrow.

The last Serer kings
The last kings of Sine and Saloum were Maad a Sinig Mahecor Joof (also spelled: Mahecor Diouf) and Maad Saloum Fode N'Gouye Joof (also spelled: Fodé N’Gouye Diouf or Fode Ngui Joof) respectively.  They both died in 1969. After their deaths, the Serer Kingdoms of Sine and Saloum were incorporated into independent Senegal which gained its independence from France in 1960. The Serer kingdoms of Sine and Saloum are two of few pre-colonial African Kingdoms whose royal dynasty survived up to the 20th century.

The Serer kingdoms

Serer kingdoms included the Kingdom of Sine and the Kingdom of Saloum. In addition to these twin Serer kingdoms, the Serers also ruled in the Wolof kingdoms such as Jolof, Waalo, Cayor and Baol. The Kingdom of Baol was originally an old Serer Kingdom ruled by the Serer paternal dynasties such as Joof family, the Njie family, etc. and the Wagadou maternal dynasty prior to the Battle of Danki in 1549. The Faal (var: Fall) paternal dynasty of Cayor and Baol that ruled after 1549 following the Battle of Danki were originally Black Moors (Naari Kajoor). Prior to the Faal dynasty of Cayor and Baol, these two kingdoms were ruled by the Serer people with the patrilineages "Joof" or Diouf, Faye and Njie, and the maternal lineage of Wagadou – members of the royal families from the Ghana Empire (proper "Wagadou Empire") who married into the Serer aristocracy.

All the kings that ruled Serer Kingdoms had Serer surnames, with the exception of the Mboge and Faal paternal dynasties whose reigns are very recent and they did not provide many kings.

Religion

In contemporary times, about 85% of the Serers are Muslim, while others are Christian. Some Serers still follow traditional religious beliefs.

According to James Olson – professor of History specializing on Ethnic Group studies, the Serer people "violently resisted the expansion of Islam" by the Wolof people in the 19th century, and then became a target of the 1861 jihad led by the Mandinka cleric Ma Ba Jaxoo. The inter-ethnic wars involving the Serer continued till 1887 when the French colonial forces conquered Senegal. Thereafter, the conversion of the Serer people accelerated. By early 1910s, about 40% of the Serer people had adopted Islam, and by 1990s about 85% of them were Muslims. Most of the newly converted Serer people have joined Sufi Muslim Brotherhoods, particularly the Mouride and Tijaniyyah Tariqas.

The Serer's traditional religion is called a ƭat Roog ('the way of the Divine'). It believes in a universal Supreme Deity called Roog (var : Rog). The Cangin language speakers refer to the supreme being as Koox. Serer religious beliefs encompasses ancient chants and poems; veneration and offerings to Serer gods, goddesses, the pangool (ancestral spirits and saints); astronomy; rites of passage; medicine; cosmology and the history of the Serer people.

Society

Occupation
The Serers practice trade, agriculture, fishing, boat building and animal husbandry.  Traditionally the Serer people have been farmers and landowners. Although they practice animal husbandry, they are generally less known for that, as in the past, Serer nobles entrusted their herds to the pastoralist Fulas, even today. However, they are known for their mixed-farming. Trade is also a recent phenomenon among some Serers.  For the Serers, the soil (where their ancestors lay in rest) is very important to them and they guard it with jealousy.  They have a legal framework governing every aspect of life even land law with strict guidelines.  Apart from agriculture (and other forms of production or occupation such as animal husbandry, fishing especially among the Serer-Niominka, boat building, etc.), some occupations especially trade they viewed as vulgar, common and ignoble. Hence in the colonial era, especially among the Serer nobles, they would hire others to do the trading on their behalf (e.g. Moors) acting as their middlemen.

Social stratification

The Serer people have traditionally been a socially stratified society, like many West African ethnic groups with castes.

The mainstream view has been that the Mandinka (or Malinka) Guelowars of Kaabu conquered and subjugated the Serer people. That view (propelled during the colonial era probably due to anti-Serer sentiments) has now been discarded as there is nothing in the Serer oral tradition that speaks of a military conquest, but a union based on marriage. A marriage between the noble Guelowar maternal clan and the noble Serer patriclans. This view is supported by Senegalese historians and writers such as Alioune Sarr, Biram Ngom and Babacar Sédikh Diouf. With the exception of Maysa Wali, this would explain why none of the kings of Sine and Saloum (two of the Serer precolonial kingdoms) bore Mandinka surnames, but Serer surname throughout the 600 years reign of the Guelwar maternal dynasty. The Serer noble patriclans simply married Guelowar women, and their offsprings bearing Serer surnames reigned in Sine and Saloum. The Guelowars also viewed themselves as Serer and assimilated in Serer culture. The alliance was an alliance based on marriage.

In other regions where Serer people are found, state JD Fage, Richard Gray and Roland Oliver, the Wolof and Toucouleur peoples introduced the caste system among the Serer people.

The social stratification historically evidenced among the Serer people has been, except for one difference, very similar to those found among Wolof, Fulbe, Toucouleur and Mandinka peoples found in Senegambia. They all have had strata of free nobles and peasants, artisan castes, and slaves. The difference is that the Serer people have retained a matrilineal inheritance system. According to historian Martin A. Klein the caste systems among the Serer emerged as a consequence of the Mandinka people's Sine-Saloum guelowar conquest, and when the Serer people sought to adapt and participate in the new Senegambian state system.

The previously held view that the Serer only follow a matrilineal structure is a matter of conjecture. Although matrilineality (tim in Serer) is very important in Serer culture, the Serer follow a bilineal system. Both matrilineality and patrilineality are important in Serer custom. Inheritance depends on the nature of the asset being inherited. That is, whether the asset is a maternal (ƭeen yaay) or paternal (kucarla) asset.

The hierarchical highest status among the Serer people has been those of hereditary nobles and their relatives, which meant blood links to the Mandinka conquerors. Below the nobles, came tyeddo, or the warriors and chiefs who had helped the Mandinka rulers and paid tribute. The third status, and the largest strata came to be the jambur, or free peasants who lacked the power of the nobles. Below the jambur were the artisan castes, who inherited their occupation. These castes included blacksmiths, weavers, jewelers, leatherworkers, carpenters, griots who kept the oral tradition through songs and music. Of these, all castes had a taboo in marrying a griot, and they could not be buried like others. Below the artisan castes in social status have been the slaves, who were either bought at slave markets, seized as captives, or born to a slave parent.

The view that the jambur (or jambuur) caste were among the lower echelons of society is a matter of debate. The jaraff, who was the most important person after the king (Maad a Sinig or Maad Saloum) came from the jambur caste. The Jaraff was the equivalent of a prime minister. He was responsible for organising the coronation ceremony and for crowning the Serer kings. Where a king dies without nominating an heir (buumi), the Jaraff would step in and reign as regent until a suitable candidate can be found from the royal line. The noble council that was responsible for advising the king was also made up of jamburs as well as the bur kuvel/guewel (the chief griot of the king) who was extremely powerful and influential, and very rich in land and other assets. The buur kevel who also came from the griot caste were so powerful that they could influence a king's decision as to whether he goes to war or not. They told the king what to eat, and teach them how to eat, how to walk, to talk and to behave in society. They always accompany the king to the battlefield and recount the glory or bravery of his ancestors in battle. They retain and pass down the genealogy and family history of the king. The bur Kevel could make or break a king, and destroy the entire royal dynasty if they so wish. The abdication of Fakha Boya Fall from the throne of Saloum was led and driven by his own bur kevel. After being forced to abdicate, he was chased out of Saloum. During the reign of Sanou Mon Faye – king of Sine, one of the key notables who plotted to dethrone the king was the king's own bur kevel. After influencing the king's own estranged nephew Prince Semou Mak Joof to take up arms against his uncle, the Prince who despised his uncle took up arms with the support of the bur kevel and other notables. The Prince was victorious and was crowned Maad a Sinig (King of Sine). That is just a sample of the power of the bur kevel who was also a member of the griot caste.

The slave castes continue to be despised, they do not own land and work as tenant farmers, marriage across caste lines is forbidden and lying about one's caste prior to marriage has been a ground for divorce. The land has been owned by the upper social strata, with the better plots near the villages belonging to the nobles. The social status of the slave has been inherited by birth.

Serer religion and culture forbids slavery. "To enslave another human being is regarded as an enslavement of their soul thereby preventing the very soul of the slave owner or trader from entering Jaaniiw – the sacred place where good souls go after their physical body has departed the world of the living. In accordance with the teachings of Seereer religion, bad souls will not enter Jaaniiw. Their departed souls will not be guided by the ancestors to this sacred abode, but will be rejected thereby making them lost and wandering souls. In order to be reincarnated ((ciiɗ, in Seereer) or sanctified as a Pangool in order to intercede with the Divine [ Roog ], a person's soul must first enter this sacred place."  As such, the Serers who were the victims of Islamic jihads and enslavements did not participate much in slavery and when they do, it was merely in revenge. This view is supported by scholars such as François G. Richard who posits that:
The Kingdom of Sine remained a modest participant in the Atlantic system, secondary to the larger Wolof, Halpulaar [ Fula and Toucouleur people ] or Mandinka polities surrounding it on all sides... As practices of enslavement intensified among other ethnic groups during the 18th century, fuelling a lucrative commerce in captives and the rise of internal slavery, the Siin may have been demoted to the rank of second player, in so far as the kingdom was never a major supplier of captives. 
The Serer ethnic group is rather diverse, and as Martin A. Klein notes, the institution of slavery did not exist among the Serer-Noon and N'Dieghem.

Culture
The Serer's favourite food is called Chere (or saay) in the Serer language (pounded coos). They control all the phases of this dish from production to preparation. Other ethnic groups (or Serers), tend to buy it from Serer women market traders or contract it out to them especially if they are holding major ceremonial events. Chere is very versatile and can be eaten with fermented milk or cream and sugar as a breakfast cereal or prepared just as a standard couscous.  The Serer traditional attire is called Serr. It is normally woven by Serer men and believed to bring good luck among those who wear it. Marriages are usually arranged.  In the event of the death of an elder, the sacred "Gamba" (a big calabash with a small hollow-out) is beaten followed by the usual funeral regalia to send them off to the next life.

Wrestling and sports

Senegalese wrestling called "Laamb" or Njom in Serer originated from the Serer Kingdom of Sine. It was a preparatory exercise for war among the warrior classes.  That style of wrestling (a brutal and violent form) is totally different from the sport wrestling enjoyed by all Senegambian ethnic groups today, nevertheless, the ancient rituals are still visible in the sport version. Among the Serers, wrestling is classified into different techniques and each technique takes several years to master. Children start young trying to master the basics before moving on to the more advance techniques like the "mbapatte", which is one of the oldest techniques and totally different from modern wrestling. Yékini (real name: "Yakhya Diop"), who is a professional wrestler in Senegal is one of the top wrestlers proficient in the "mbapatte" technique. Lamba and sabar (musical instruments) are used as music accompaniments in wrestling matches as well as in circumcision dances and royal festivals. Serer wrestling crosses ethnic boundaries and is a favourite pastime for Senegalese and Gambians alike.

Music
The Sabar (drum) tradition associated with the Wolof people originated from the Serer Kingdom of Sine and spread to the Kingdom of Saloum. The Wolof people who migrated to Serer Saloum picked it up from there and spread it to Wolof Kingdoms. Each motif has a purpose and is used for different occasions. Individual motifs represent the history and genealogy of a particular family and are used during weddings, naming ceremonies, funerals etc.

The Njuup (progenitor of Mbalax) and Tassu traditions (also Tassou) (progenitor of rap music) both originated from the Serer people. The Tassu was used when chanting ancient religious verses.  The people would sing then interweave it with a Tassu. The late Serer Diva Yandé Codou Sène who was the griot of the late and former president of Senegal (Leopold Sedar Senghor) was proficient in the "Tassu".  She was the best Tassukat (one who Tassu) of her generation.  Originally religious in nature, the griots of Senegambia regardless of ethnic group or religion picked it up from Serer religious practices and still use it in different occasions e.g. marriages, naming ceremonies or when they are just singing the praises of their patrons. Most Senegalese and Gambian artists use it in their songs even the younger generation like "Baay Bia". The Senegalese music legend Youssou N'Dour who is also a Serer, uses "Tassu" in many of his songs.

Serer relations to Moors
In the pre-colonial era, Moors from Mauritania who came to settle in the Serer kingdoms such as the Kingdom of Sine, etc., were ill-treated by their Serer masters. If a Moor dies in a Serer kingdom, his body was dragged out of the country and left for the vultures to feast on if there is no family or friend to claim the body and bury it elsewhere.  They were also never accompanied by grave goods.  No matter how long a Mauritanian Moor has lived in the area as a migrant, he could never achieve high status within the Serer aristocracy.  The best position he could ever wish for within Serer high society was to work as a Bissit (Bissik). Apart from spying for the Serer Kings, the Bissit's  main job was to be a clown – for the sole entertainment of the Serer King, the Serer aristocracy and the common people.  He was expected to dance in ceremonies before the king and liven up the king's mood and the king's subjects.  This position was always given to the Moors.  It was a humiliating job and not a title of honour. According to some, the history of this position goes back to an early Moor in Serer country who had a child by his own daughter.

Joking relationship (Maasir or Kalir)
Serers and Toucouleurs are linked by a bond of "cousinage".  This is a tradition common to many ethnic groups of West Africa known as Maasir (var : Massir) in Serer language (Joking relationship) or kal, which comes from kalir (a deformation of the Serer word kucarla meaning paternal lineage or paternal inheritance). This joking relationship enables one group to criticise another, but also obliges the other with mutual aid and respect. The Serers call this Maasir or Kalir. This is because the Serers and the Toucouleurs are related – according to Wiliam J. foltz "Tukulor are a mixture of Fulani and Serer" The Serers also maintain the same bond with the Jola people with whom they have an ancient relationship. In the Serer ethnic group, this same bond exists between the Serer patronym, for example between Joof and Faye.

Many Senegambian people also refer to this joking relations as "kal" (used between first cousins for example between the children of a paternal aunt and a maternal uncle) and "gamo" (used between tribes).  "Kal" derives from the Serer word "Kalir" a deformation of "kurcala" which means paternal lineage or inheritance and is used exactly in that context by many Senegambians. The word gamo derives from the old Serer word gamohu – an ancient divination ceremony.

Serer languages

Most people who identify themselves as Serer speak the Serer language. This is spoken in Sine-Saloum, Kaolack, Diourbel, Dakar, and in Gambia, and is part of the national curriculum of Senegal. Historically the Serer people's unwillingness to trade directly during the colonial era was a double edged sword to the Serer language as well as the Cangin languages.  That resulted in the Wolof language being the dominant language in the market place as well as the factories. However, the Serer language, among other local languages, is now part of the national curriculum of Senegal.

About 200,000 Serer speak various Cangin languages, such as Ndut and Saafi, which are not closely related to Serer proper (Serer-Sine language). There are clear lexical similarities among the Cangin languages. However, they are more closely related to other languages than to Serer, and vice versa. For comparison in the table below, 85% is approximately the dividing line between dialects and different languages.

Serer patronyms

Some common Serer surnames are:

Joof or Diouf
Faye
Ngom or Ngum
Sène (var : Sene or Sain)
Diagne
Dione or Jon
N'Diaye
Tine
 Lame
Loum
Ndaw or Ndao
Diene (var : Diène) or Jein
Thiaw
Senghor
Ndour or Ndur
Ndione
Gadio
Sarr
Kama
Chorr or Thior
Charreh or Thiare
Dièye or Jaye (var : Jaay) etc... are all typical Serer surnames.

Notable Serer people
Léopold Sedar Senghor, first president of Senegal from 1960 to 1980
Abdou Diouf, second president of Senegal and former secretary general of the Organisation Internationale de la Francophonie
Ngalandou Diouf, the first African elected to office in French West Africa
Al Njie, Senegalese footballer
Marième Faye Sall – current First Lady of Senegal (as of 2020); wife of President Macky Sall.
Fallou Diagne, Senegalese footballer
Fatou Diome, Senegalese author
Safi Faye, Senegalese film director and ethnologist
Alhaji Alieu Ebrima Cham Joof late Senegambian historian, politician and colonial-era advocate for Gambia's independence
Laïty Kama, Senegalese Lawyer and the first president of the International Criminal Tribunal for Rwanda
Issa Laye Thiaw, Senegalese historian and theologian
Alioune Sarr, Senegalese historian and politician
Isatou Njie-Saidy, former Vice-president of Gambia
Alieu Ebrima Cham Joof, Gambian historian
Yandé Codou Sène, Senegalese griot and musician
Youssou Ndour, Senegalese musician
M'Baye Leye, Senegalese footballer
Mame Biram Diouf, Senegalese footballer
Robert Diouf, Senegalese wrestler
El Hadji Diouf, Senegalese footballer
Khaby Lame, Senegalese-born Italian social media personality
Ismaïla Sarr, Senegalese footballer 
Malang Sarr, Senegalese footballer
Oulimata Sarr, Senegalese politician 
Moustapha Name, Senegalese footballer
Mouhamadou Drammeh, Senegalese footballer
Ousmane Ndong, Senegalese footballer
Abdoulaye Faye, Senegalese footballer

See also

Other ethnic groups
Ethnic groups in Senegal
List of African ethnic groups

Senegal
Demographics of Senegal
List of presidents of Senegal (Senegal had three presidents after independence.  Both the first and second were Serers – 1960 – 2011).

Films
Kaddu Beykat
Mossane (Serer-themed)
Yandé Codou, la griotte de Senghor

Notes

Bibliography
 Diouf, Mamadou & Leichtman, Mara, New perspectives on Islam in Senegal: conversion, migration, wealth, power, and femininity. Published by: Palgrave Macmillan. 2009. the University of Michigan. 
 Diouf, Mamadou, History of Senegal: Islamo-Wolof model and its outskirts. Maisonneuve & Larose. 2001. 
 Gamble, David P., & Salmon, Linda K. (with Alhaji Hassan Njie), Gambian Studies No. 17. People of the Gambia. I. The Wolof with notes on the Serer and Lebou San Francisco 1985.
Niang, Mor Sadio, "CEREMONIES ET FÊTES TRADITIONNELLES", IFAN, [in] Éthiopiques, numéro 31 révue socialiste de culture négro-africaine 3e trimestre (1982)
 Taal, Ebou Momar, Senegambian Ethnic Groups: Common Origins and Cultural Affinities Factors and Forces of National Unity, Peace and Stability. 2010
Diouf, Niokhobaye. "Chronique du royaume du Sine." Suivie de notes sur les traditions orales et les sources écrites concernant le royaume du Sine par Charles Becker et Victor Martin. (1972). Bulletin de l'Ifan, Tome 34, Série B, n° 4, (1972)
 Berg, Elizabeth L., & Wan, Ruth, "Senegal". Marshall Cavendish. 2009.
 Mahoney, Florence, Stories of Senegambia. Publisher by Government Printer, 1982
 Daggs, Elisa . All Africa: All its political entities of independent or other status. Hasting House, 1970. 
 Department of Arts of Africa, Oceania, and the Americas, The Metropolitan Museum of Art. Hilburn Timeline of Art History. The Fulani/Fulbe People.
 Schuh, Russell G., The Use and Misuse of language in the study of African history.  1997
 Burke, Andrew & Else, David, The Gambia & Senegal, 2nd edition – September 2002. Published by Lonely Planet Publications Pty Ltd, page 13
 Nanjira, Daniel Don, African Foreign Policy and Diplomacy: From Antiquity to the 21st Century. Page 91–92. Published by ABC-CLIO. 2010. 
 Lombard, Maurice, The golden age of Islam. Page 84. Markus Wiener Publishers. 2003. ,
 Oliver, Roland Anthony, & Fage, J. D., Journal of African History. Volume 10.  Published by: Cambridge University Press. 1969
 The African archaeological review, Volumes 17–18. Published by: Plenum Press, 2000
 Ajayi, J. F. Ade & Crowder, Michael, History of West Africa, Volume 1. Published by: Longman, 1985. 
 Peter Malcolm Holt, The Indian Sub-continent, south-East Asia, Africa and the Muslim West. Volume 2, Part 1. Published by: Cambridge University Press. 1977. 
 Page, Willie F., Encyclopedia of African history and culture: African kingdoms (500 to 1500). Volume 2. Published by: Facts on File. 2001. 
 Ham, Anthony, West Africa. Published by: Lonely Planet. 2009. , 
 Mwakikagile, Godfrey, Ethnic Diversity and Integration in the Gambia. Page 224
 Richard, François G., "Recharting Atlantic encounters. Object trajectories and histories of value in the Siin (Senegal) and Senegambia". Archaeological Dialogues 17 (1) 1–27. Cambridge University Press 2010
 Diop, Samba, The Wolof Epic: From Spoken Word to Written Text. "The Epic of Ndiadiane Ndiaye"
 Two studies on ethnic group relations in Africa – Senegal, The United Republic of Tanzania. Pages 14–15. UNESCO. 1974
 Galvan, Dennis Charles, The State Must Be Our Master of Fire: How Peasants Craft Culturally Sustainable Development in Senegal. Berkeley, University of California Press, 2004
 Klein, Martin A., Islam and Imperialism in Senegal Sine-Saloum, 1847–1914, Edinburgh University Press (1968)
 Colvin, Lucie Gallistel, Historical Dictionary of Senegal. Scarecrow Press/ Metuchen. NJ – London (1981) 
 Sonko Godwin, Patience,  Leaders of Senegambia Region, Reactions To European Infiltration 19th–20th Century. Sunrise Publishers Ltd – The Gambia (1995) 
 Sonko Godwin, Patience, Ethnic Groups of The Senegambia Region, A Brief History. p. 32, Third Edition.  Sunrise Publishers Ltd – The Gambia (2003). 
 Clark, Andrew F., & Philips, Lucie Colvin, Historical Dictionary of Senegal. Second Edition (1994)
 Portions of this article were translated from the French language Wikipedia article :fr:Sérères, 2008-07-08 and August 2011.

External links

 Moving from Teaching African Customary Laws to Teaching African Indigenous Law.  By Dr Fatou. K. Camara
 Ethnolyrical. Tassou: The Ancient Spoken Word of African Women
 The Seereer Resource Centre
 Seereer Radio
 Seereer Resource Centre and Seereer Radio Podcast
 Seereer Heritage Press (publishing house)

 
Ethnoreligious groups in Africa
Ethnic groups in Senegal
Ethnic groups in the Gambia
Ethnic groups in Mauritania
Fishing communities